Alan W. Robertson (9 December 1906 – 1978) was a British philatelist who was added to the Roll of Distinguished Philatelists in 1961.

References

Signatories to the Roll of Distinguished Philatelists
1906 births
1978 deaths
British philatelists